Neoharriotta is a genus of fish in the family Rhinochimaeridae.

Species
 Neoharriotta carri Bullis & J. S. Carpenter, 1966 (Dwarf sicklefin chimaera)
 Neoharriotta pinnata Schnakenbeck, 1931 (Sicklefin chimaera)
 Neoharriotta pumila Didier & Stehmann, 1996 (Arabian sicklefin chimaera)

References

 
Cartilaginous fish genera
Taxa named by Henry Bryant Bigelow
Taxa named by William Charles Schroeder
Taxonomy articles created by Polbot